Artem Tatarevich (born 28 January 1992) is a Belarusian professional footballer who plays for Volna Pinsk.

Honours
Dinamo Brest
Belarusian Cup winner: 2016–17

External links 
 
 
 Profile at pressball.by

1992 births
Living people
Sportspeople from Pinsk
Belarusian footballers
Association football midfielders
FC Volna Pinsk players
FC Dynamo Brest players